Child saints are children who died or were martyred and have been declared saints or martyrs of the Roman Catholic, Eastern Orthodox, Coptic Orthodox, Anglican, Episcopalian, or Lutheran Churches or have been beatified.

Early Christian Saints

Orthodox Church

Episcopal Church

Catholic Church

Group Martyrs

Martyrs of China

Martyrs of Japan

Martyrs of Korea

Martyrs of Kosheh
 Al-Amir Helmy Fahmy
 Maysoon Ghatas Fahmy
 Refaat Fayez Awad Fahmy
 Wael El-Dabai Mikhail

Martyrs of Nag Hammadi
 Mina Helmy Said
 Bishoy Farid Labib
 Dina Hamalni
 Boula Atef Yassa
 Abanoub Kamal Nashed

Martyrs of the Nazi regime

Martyrs of the Spanish Civil War

Martyrs of Vietnam
 Andrew Trong Van Tram
 Anê Dần
 Giuse Túc
 Thomas Thien Tran

Other Catholic Martyrs

Dubious or fictitious

William of Norwich was a twelve year old English boy whose unsolved murder was, at the time, attributed to the Jewish community of Norwich. It is the first known medieval accusation against Jews of ritual murder. E. M. Rose points out that road robberies and kidnappings gone wrong were a frequent cause of death in the region during the period of The Anarchy when the Crown struggled to safeguard the roads. This was followed by a similar allegation regarding the unexplained death of Harold of Gloucester. An attempt to establish a cult of Harold seems to have been unsuccessful. It was never officially supported and died out long before the Reformation. However, it established a pattern. Any unexplained child death occurring near the Easter festival was arbitrarily linked to Jews in the vicinity. In some instances promotion of a cult may have been influenced by the interest of local clergy to enhance the prestige of their church with a shrine. Anthony Bale suggests this, and local politics, may have been contributing factors to the cult of Robert of Bury. Simon of Trent and Werner of Oberwesel are other examples of individuals who died under unknown circumstances, but whose deaths were nonetheless attributed to the Jews.

Little Saint Hugh of Lincoln was never actually canonised, making the moniker "Little Saint Hugh" a misnomer. He was for a short while acclaimed by local people as a saint but never officially recognised as one. Over time, the issue of the rush to sainthood was raised, and Hugh was never canonised, nor included in Catholic martyrology.

In the case of Dominguito del Val, and Andreas Oxner, and the Holy Child of La Guardia it is not clear that the alleged victim ever existed in the first place.

See also 
 498 Spanish Martyrs
 Chinese Martyrs
 Consecrated virgin
 List of Servants of God
 Lists of venerable people (disambiguation)
 List of blesseds
 List of saints
 Persecution of Christians
 Twenty-six Martyrs of Japan

References

Further reading

External links 
 Hagiography Circle
 Saints.SQPN.com Partial list of saints who died as children.
 Child Saints, Martyrs and the Heroes of Orthodoxy
 Asian Saints Photostream Flickr page containing the images of some Asian child saints.

 
Saints
Saints
Children
Saints
Child saints